Ruki Tipuna (born 11 May 1983) is a New Zealand rugby union footballer who has played for Aviva Premiership side Bristol Rugby, Bay of Plenty Steamers, the Hurricanes, Portadown RFC and Scarlets. His position is at scrum-half.

Tipuna has also represented the New Zealand Sevens and New Zealand Māori teams.

In August 2011, Tipanu joined the Scarlets on a short term contract, before joining Bristol in November. He immediately became first choice scrum-half at Bristol. On 28 March 2014, Tipuna made his move to the Aviva Premiership with Newcastle Falcons on a two-year contract from the 2014-15 season.

References

External links
Scarlets sign Ruki Tipanu
Bristol sign Ruki Tipuna
Bristol Rugby profile

1983 births
Living people
New Zealand rugby union players
Bay of Plenty rugby union players
Wellington rugby union players
Bristol Bears players
Newcastle Falcons players
Scarlets players
Māori All Blacks players
New Zealand international rugby sevens players
New Zealand expatriate rugby union players
New Zealand expatriate sportspeople in England
New Zealand expatriate sportspeople in Wales
Expatriate rugby union players in England
Expatriate rugby union players in Wales
Rugby union scrum-halves
People from Tauranga
Male rugby sevens players